The Typica (Slavonic: Изобрази́тельны, Izobrazítelny) is a part of the Divine Office of Eastern Orthodox and Greek Catholic Churches that is appointed to be read on any day the Liturgy is celebrated with vespers, or the Typicon does not permit the celebration of the Liturgy (as occurs, for example, on weekdays during Great Lent), or may be celebrated but is not either because no priest is present, or because no priest for whatever reason celebrates the Liturgy. When the Liturgy may be celebrated but is not, then the Typica is read at the time the Liturgy is appointed to be celebrated, and it contains the scriptural readings and other propers for the Liturgy.

The Typica, like the hours that it is aggregated with, is rarely read in Greek parish churches, but it is relatively common in Slavic churches.

The name "Typica" refers to the "Typical Psalms" (Psalm 102, Psalm 145, and the Beatitudes), which together with parts of the Liturgy of the Catechumens comprise the non-lenten form of the Typica.

Description 

When read in place of the Liturgy's celebration, the Typica is read after the Sixth Hour in the place where the Liturgy would be celebrated; otherwise it is read after the Ninth Hour.

When replacing the Liturgy, the propers of the Liturgy are used, e.g., the troparia inserted between the verses of the Beatitudes, the troparia and kontakia before the Trisagion, and the scriptural readings with their corresponding prokimena.

On the weekdays of Great Lent the Psalms are omitted and between the verses of the Beatitudes is inserted "Remember us, O Lord, when Thou comest into Thy kingdom" with prostrations, there are no readings, and, as is typical of Lenten services, the Prayer of St. Ephraim is used.

The Typica is also appointed to be read after the Royal Hours on the Eve of Nativity, the Eve of Theophany, and on Great Friday.

Text 
The text of the Typica can be found in English in several places including "The Unabbreviated Horologion". The text is available online in Church Slavonic and, for the Lenten form only, in Greek.

Notes

References

Citations

Bibliography
 
 
 Archbishop Averky — Liturgics, Retrieved 2011-12-28

Eastern Orthodox liturgy